Angelica Delgado (born December 14, 1990) is an American judoka.

She competed at the 2016 Summer Olympics in Rio de Janeiro, in the women's 52 kg.

In 2021, she competed in the women's 52 kg event at the 2020 Summer Olympics in Tokyo, Japan.

References

External links
 

1990 births
Living people
American female judoka
Olympic judoka of the United States
Judoka at the 2016 Summer Olympics
Judoka at the 2020 Summer Olympics
Pan American Games medalists in judo
Pan American Games bronze medalists for the United States
Judoka at the 2011 Pan American Games
Judoka at the 2015 Pan American Games
Medalists at the 2011 Pan American Games
Medalists at the 2015 Pan American Games
21st-century American women